Petr Uličný (born 11 February 1950 in Uničov) is a former Czech football player and manager.

Having previously managed Sigma Olomouc until 2006, guiding the club to finishes of third, fourth and ninth, Uličný returned in December 2011.

Honours

Manager
SK Sigma Olomouc
 Czech Cup: 2011–12

References

External links
  1. FC Brno profile

1950 births
Living people
People from Uničov
Czech footballers
AC Sparta Prague players
SK Sigma Olomouc players
FC Viktoria Plzeň players
Czech football managers
Czech First League managers
FC Fastav Zlín managers
FC Zbrojovka Brno managers
FC Baník Ostrava managers
FC Viktoria Plzeň managers
FK Viktoria Žižkov managers
SFC Opava managers
FC Hradec Králové managers
SK Sigma Olomouc managers
1. HFK Olomouc managers
Expatriate football managers in Slovakia
MFK Ružomberok managers
Association footballers not categorized by position
Sportspeople from the Olomouc Region